Shockforce: Battles in the Remnants of America is a miniatures game published by Demonblade Games in 1998.

Contents
Shockforce: Battles in the Remnants of America is a miniatures wargame.

Reception
The reviewer from the online second volume of Pyramid stated that "The line was originally built upon pieces commissioned but not paid for by Grenadier, but since has been expanded to great effect. Each month's releases have been getting better and better, and I think we can expect great things from Demonblade in the near future."

Reviews
Shadis #48 (June, 1998)
Backstab #9

References

Board games introduced in 1998